Mentir para vivir (English: Life of Lies) is a Mexican telenovela directed by Benjamín Cann and produced by Rosy Ocampo for Televisa that aired on Canal de las Estrellas from Monday, June 3, 2013 to Sunday, October 20, 2013. The telenovela is written by Maria Zarattini, who last wrote La Fuerza del Destino (2011).

Mayrín Villanueva and David Zepeda star as the protagonists, while  Altair Jarabo, Leticia Perdigón, and Diego Olivera star as the main antagonists.

In the United States the telenovela aired on Univision from Monday, October 7, 2013 to Friday, February 28, 2014.

Plot
Oriana Caligaris (Mayrín Villanueva) and José Luis Falcón (Diego Olivera) are a Mexican couple who lives in Colombia with their six years old daughter, Alina (Ana Paula Martinez).

José Luis works in Colombian customs. One day, he confesses to Oriana about his involvement in a smuggling operation, and that the earnings are deposited into an account opened in Oriana's name but without her consent. For this, Jose told Oriana that the police is searching for them.

Disappointed and out of fear, Oriana escapes to Mexico with her daughter Alina, to find her dear friend, Raquel [Altair Jarabo], who along with Lucina (Cecilia Gabriela) own the hotel "El Descanso" in San Carlos, Sonora. Raquel decided to keep Oriana and her daughter in their hotel for the few days they would be staying. José Luis supposedly died in a chase with police.

Among the hotel guests is Don Gabriel Sánchez (Alejandro Tommasi), an old friend of Lucia. Gabriel is a partner at a major spinning and weaving factory located in Hermosillo, Sonora. He is a  widow that is remarried to Lila [Lourdes Munguia], an ambitious woman that is twenty years younger than him. Lila has a brother, Berto [Ferdinando Valencia], who is a playboy.

One afternoon while Don Gabriel was  relaxing at the hotel, Alina saw a gun by the beach while she was playing. The gun was dropped by some drunk guys the previous day. While Alina tried to show Gabriel the gun, she accidentally shot him in the chest. Gabriel falls dead. On hearing the shot, Oriana runs and sees his daughter with a gun. Out of fear and in a bid to protect them, Raquel and Lucina send Oriana and Alina to Guaymas, Sonora.

When Ricardo [David Zepeda] arrives in San Carlos to collect the body of his father and initiate investigations, it was reported that the main suspect of the crime is a young woman who is accompanied by her young daughter.

Few days after the shooting, Anas Valdivia [Laisha Wilkins],  a strange, depressed  and lonely young woman checked into the hotel, and drowned herself. Always-clever Lucina takes the opportunity to pass on Anas' identification, thus making Oriana impersonate Anas. This is to clear Oriana of her involvement in the murder of Don Gabriel. Though this was against Oriana's will, but she accepted because she has no choice but to 'Lie to Live'.

Living as Anas, Oriana worked in a cloth store, starting her life all over. She also changed Alina's name to Catalina and explained why she changed their names - so that they won't be separated.

Few weeks after, Mrs. Paloma Aresti (Adriana Roel), Ricardo's godmother and a wealthy woman who is in search of her only grandchild and heir, hired a private investigator, who went by the hotel to search for Anas Valdivia.  an investigator sent by who is looking for her only grandchild and heir, whom she does not know: Inés Valdivia. Again timely, Lucina, knowing what she had done with Anas' identity, led the investigator to Oriana, painting her to be the 'likely' granddaughter of the wealthy old woman. She also told the investigator that she saw a little girl with the supposed Anas. Lucina then gives the investigator Oriana' picture, telling him it's Anas. Lucina also gives a brush with a lock of Anas' hair and advised a DNA test.

Eventually, Anas (Oriana) is located by Paloma, who takes her to live with her. There, Oriana meets Ricardo. Oriana then becomes  a partner in Paloma's spinning and weaving factory.

Gabriel's son, Ricardo [David Zepeda] is a successful engineer who has a and rebellious teenager Sebastián (Alejandro Speitzer).

The attraction between Oriana and Ricardo is immediate without imagining that there are among them many obstacles and adversities secrets to be overcome. Circumstances further complicate when José Luis who in reality is not dead comes back to Mexico determined to get his family and fight in a game of lies and truths, in which love will triumph in the end.

Cast

Main cast 
Mayrín Villanueva as Oriana Caligaris/Inés Valdivia
David Zepeda as Ricardo Sánchez Bretón
Diego Olivera as José Luis Falcón
Altair Jarabo as Raquel Ledesma

Supporting cast 

Adriana Roel† as Paloma Aresti de Camargo
Leticia Perdigón as Matilde Aresti de Camargo
Cecilia Gabriela as Lucina González
Nuria Bages as Fidelia Bretón
Lourdes Munguía as Lila Martín de Sánchez
Ferdinando Valencia as Berto Martín†
Joaquín Cosío as Joaquín Barragán†
Luis Gatica as Samuel Barragán
Juan Carlos Barreto as Rubén Camargo
Fabián Robles as Piero Verástegui
Felipe Nájera as Padre Mariano†
Patricio Castillo† as Homero de la Garza 
Osvaldo de León as Leonardo Olvera de la Garza
Luis Fernando Peña as Eliseo†
Geraldine Galván as Fabiola Camargo Aresti
Lucas Velázquez as César Camargo Aresti
Alejandro Speitzer as Sebastián Sánchez Bretón
Ana Paula Martínez as Alina Falcón Caligaris
Alberto Agnesi as Antonio Araujo
Mariluz Bermúdez as Marilú Tapia
Manuel Guízar† as Benigno Jiménez
Mariana Garza as María Jiménez†
Joana Brito as Nadia
María Prado as Elvira
Claudia Ortega as Berenice
Ignacio Guadalupe as Manolo
José Montini as Teniente Carmelo Hernández
Juan Romanca as Celio
Manuel Raviela as Felipe
Pablo Valentín as Comandante Alejandro Lazcano
Teo Tapia as Patrick Ontiveros
Toño Infante as Armando
Uriel del Toro as Pedro
Benjamín Islas as Ceferino
Claudio Roca as Bonifacio
Leandro Castello as John
Leonardo Cappi as Federico
Libia Regalado as Chelito 
Wiebaldo López† as Obispo
Rosita Bouchot as Perla
Ricardo Vera as Porfirio
Fernanda Ruizos as Trabajadora Social
Veticeyva Vielma as Lupe
Aurora Clavel as Eduviges
Germán Gutiérrez as Ezequiel Santos
Erik Guecha as Jorge
Ignacio Casano as Mike Rodríguez
Rafael del Villar as Lic. Julio Manrique
Raymundo Capetillo† as Edmundo Valencia
Francisco Avendaño as Veterinario
Reneé Varsi as Dra. Marylin Lomelí
Juan Sahagún as Enrique Escalona
Beatriz Moreno as Rosa Toscano
Héctor Sáez as Dr. Mario Veronese

Special participation 

Erik Díaz as Ricardo
Lorena Velázquez as Señora Carmona
Kika Edgar as Young Celeste Flores
Alejandro Tommasi as Gabriel Sánchez Fernández†
Laisha Wilkins as Inés Valdivia Aresti
Dulce María as Joaquina "Jackie" Barragán
Queta Lavat as Mercedes

Production 
Mentir para vivir, itself the fourth name, was previously known as La Sustituta, Oriana, and Mentiras de verdad. Production of Mentir para vivir officially started on March 4, 2013.

Awards and nominations 
TVyNovelas Awards

References

External links

Mexican telenovelas
2013 telenovelas
Televisa telenovelas
2013 Mexican television series debuts
2013 Mexican television series endings
Spanish-language telenovelas